The 2021–22 NBL season was the 1st season for the Tasmania JackJumpers in the NBL.

Roster

Pre-season

Ladder

Game log 

|-style="background:#fcc;"
| 1
| 14 November
| Brisbane
| L 79–89
| Josh Adams (18)
| McDaniel, McVeigh (6)
| Josh Magette (5)
| MyState Bank Arena4,500
| 0–1
|-style="background:#cfc;"
| 2
| 16 November
| @ Cairns
| W 66–81
| Josh Adams (15)
| Josh Magette (6)
| Josh Magette (4)
| MyState Bank Arenanot available
| 1–1
|-style="background:#fcc;"
| 3
| 21 November
| @ Adelaide
| L 82–80
| Clint Steindl (17)
| McDaniel, Magnay (4)
| Josh Magette (8)
| Ulverstone Sports & Leisure Centrenot available
| 1–2
|-style="background:#fcc;"
| 4
| 24 November
| @ Perth
| L 98–68
| Josh Adams (17)
| Will Magnay (5)
| Josh Magette (7)
| Ulverstone Sports & Leisure Centrenot available
| 1–3
|-style="background:#cfc;"
| 5
| 26 November
| Cairns
| W 83–68
| Josh Magette (26)
| Will Magnay (9)
| Josh Magette (6)
| Elphin Sports Centrenot available
| 2–3

Regular season

Ladder

Game log 

|-style="background:#cfc;"
| 1
| 3 December
| Brisbane
| W 83–74 (OT)
| Josh Adams (20)
| Will Magnay (10)
| Josh Magette (6)
| MyState Bank Arena4,738
| 1–0
|-style="background:#fcc;"
| 2
| 9 December
| Adelaide
| L 80–83
| Clint Steindl (22)
| Jack McVeigh (6)
| Josh Magette (8)
| MyState Bank Arena4,738
| 1–1
|-style="background:#fcc;"
| 3
| 11 December
| @ Cairns
| L 69–62
| Josh Magette (19)
| Sam McDaniel (8)
| Josh Magette (5)
| Cairns Convention Centre4,015
| 1–2
|-style="background:#fcc;"
| 4
| 19 December
| @ Perth
| L 101–83
| Josh Magette (17)
| Josh Magette (7)
| Josh Magette (6)
| RAC Arena13,615
| 1–3
|-style="background:#fcc;"
| 5
| 22 December
| @ Sydney
| L 83–71
| Clint Steindl (15)
| Krslovic, Magnay (7)
| Krslovic, Magette (3)
| Qudos Bank Arena4,612
| 1–4
|-style="background:#cfc;"
| 6
| 26 December
| New Zealand
| W 84–75
| Josh Adams (21)
| McDaniel, McVeigh (6)
| Josh Magette (7)
| MyState Bank Arena4,623
| 2–4

|-style="background:#fcc;"
| 7
| 1 January
| Melbourne
| L 72–76
| Josh Adams (23)
| MiKyle McIntosh (6)
| Bairstow, Magette, Weeks (2)
| MyState Bank Arena4,685
| 2–5
|-style="background:#fcc;"
| 8
| 23 January
| S.E. Melbourne
| L 63–76
| Clint Steindl (16)
| Will Magnay (8)
| Josh Magette (9)
| MyState Bank Arena4,235
| 2–6
|-style="background:#cfc;"
| 9
| 28 January
| Adelaide
| W 76–71
| Josh Adams (24)
| Will Magnay (9)
| Josh Magette (7)
| MyState Bank Arena4,632
| 3–6
|-style="background:#cfc;"
| 10
| 30 January
| @ New Zealand
| W 59–83
| Josh Magette (22)
| Matt Kenyon (8)
| Josh Magette (8)
| MyState Bank Arena1,477
| 4–6

|-style="background:#cfc;"
| 11
| 4 February
| Sydney
| W 77–70
| Josh Magette (18)
| Magnay, McVeigh (7)
| Josh Adams (4)
| MyState Bank Arena4,643
| 5–6
|-style="background:#cfc;"
| 12
| 6 February
| @ Melbourne
| W 85–94
| Jack McVeigh (17)
| Sam McDaniel (6)
| Josh Magette (6)
| John Cain Arena8,499
| 6–6
|-style="background:#fcc;"
| 13
| 13 February
| @ S.E. Melbourne
| L 83–71
| Josh Adams (23)
| Jack McVeigh (6)
| Josh Magette (5)
| John Cain Arena3,875
| 6–7
|-style="background:#cfc;"
| 14
| 20 February
| @ Illawarra
| W 86–96
| Josh Adams (28)
| Jack McVeigh (7)
| Josh Magette (5)
| WIN Entertainment Centre2,325
| 7–7
|-style="background:#fcc;"
| 15
| 26 February
| @ Brisbane
| L 94–86
| McIntosh, McVeigh (21)
| Clint Steindl (7)
| Josh Magette (8)
| Nissan Arena2,683
| 7–8
|-style="background:#fcc;"
| 16
| 28 February
| Perth
| L 78–89
| Jack McVeigh (16)
| Krslovic, Magette, McVeigh (5)
| Josh Magette (6)
| MyState Bank Arena4,738
| 7–9

|-style="background:#cfc;"
| 17
| 5 March
| New Zealand
| W 66–62
| MiKyle McIntosh (21)
| Kenyon, McDaniel (7)
| Josh Magette (7)
| Silverdome3,532
| 8–9
|-style="background:#cfc;"
| 18
| 11 March
| @ Cairns
| 69–85
| Josh Adams (20)
| Adams, Bairstow, Kenyon, Magette (5)
| Magette, Weeks (3)
| Cairns Convention Centre3,300
| 9–9
|-style="background:#cfc;"
| 19
| 13 March
| Illawarra
| W 81–77
| Clint Steindl (20)
| Matt Kenyon (10)
| Josh Magette (7)
| MyState Bank Arena4,738
| 10–9
|-style="background:#fcc;"
| 20
| 19 March
| Illawarra
| L 65–91
| Josh Adams (21)
| Jack McVeigh (7)
| Josh Magette (6)
| Silverdome3,532
| 10–10
|-style="background:#cfc;"
| 21
| 24 March
| @ Perth
| W 83–85
| Jack McVeigh (19)
| Jack McVeigh (7)
| Adams, Magette (5)
| RAC Arena6,678
| 11–10
|-style="background:#cfc;"
| 22
| 26 March
| @ Brisbane
| W 82–84
| Magette, McVeigh (15)
| Sam McDaniel (7)
| Josh Magette (8)
| Nissan Arena2,489
| 12–10

|-style="background:#cfc;"
| 23
| 1 April 
| @ Adelaide
| W 72–80
| Josh Adams (31)
| Fabijan Krslovic (8)
| Josh Magette (7)
| Adelaide Entertainment Centre3,407
| 13–10
|-style="background:#fcc;"
| 24
| 3 April 
| Sydney
| L 83–103
| Josh Adams (18)
| Sam McDaniel (7)
| Sean MacDonald (4)
| MyState Bank Arena4,738
| 13–11
|-style="background:#cfc;"
| 25
| 8 April 
| Cairns
| W 87–80
| Jack McVeigh (16)
| Jack McVeigh (7)
| Josh Magette (7)
| MyState Bank Arena4,738
| 14–11
|-style="background:#cfc;"
| 26
| 15 April 
| @ New Zealand
| W 86–88
| Josh Adams (23)
| Kenyon, Magette, McIntosh, McVeigh  (6)
| Josh Magette (8)
| MyState Bank Arenaclosed event
| 15–11
|-style="background:#cfc;"
| 27
| 17 April 
| @ S.E. Melbourne
| W 80–84
| Jack McVeigh (26)
| Jack McVeigh (9)
| Fabijan Krslovic (6)
| John Cain Arena3,056
| 16–11
|-style="background:#cfc;"
| 28
| 23 April 
| Melbourne
| W 83–61
| MiKyle McIntosh (20)
| Jack McVeigh (10)
| Josh Magette (6)
| MyState Bank Arena4,865
| 17–11

Postseason 

|-style="background:#fcc;"
| 1
| 28 April
| @ Melbourne
| L 74–63
| Josh Adams (16)
| Adams, Krslovic (5)
| Josh Magette (6)
| John Cain Arena5,268
| 0–1
|-style="background:#cfc;"
| 2
| 30 April
| Melbourne
| W 79–72
| Jack McVeigh (15)
| Magette, McDaniel (5)
| Jarred Bairstow (4)
| MyStateBank Arena4,865
| 1–1
|-style="background:#cfc;"
| 3
| 2 May
| @ Melbourne
| W 73–76
| Josh Adams (30)
| MiKyle McIntosh (9)
| Josh Magette (7)
| John Cain Arena4,816
| 2–1

|-style="background:#fcc;"
| 4
| 6 May
| @ Sydney
| L 95–78
| McIntosh, McVeigh (14)
| Josh Adams (8)
| Josh Magette (10)
| Qudos Bank Arena12,765
| 2–2
|-style="background:#fcc;"
| 5
| 8 May
| Sydney
| L 86–90
| Josh Adams (36)
| Fabijan Krslovic (10)
| Josh Magette (5)
| MyStateBank Arena4,738
| 2–3
|-style="background:#fcc;"
| 6
| 11 May
| @ Sydney
| L 97–88
| Josh Adams (27)
| Josh Magette (9)
| Josh Magette (7)
| Qudos Bank Arena16,149
| 2–4

Transactions

Re-signed

Additions

Subtractions

Awards

Club awards 
 Coaches Award: Fabijan Krslovic
 Fan Favourite: Jack McVeigh
 Defensive Player: Matt Kenyon
 Players Award: Jarrad Weeks
 Club MVP: Josh Adams
 Spirit of the JackJumpers: Jack Soward (Operations Coordinator)

See also 
 2021–22 NBL season
 Tasmania JackJumpers

References

External links 

 Official Website

Tasmania JackJumpers
Tasmania JackJumpers seasons
Tasmania JackJumpers season